Sebastián Eduardo Leto (born 30 August 1986) is a former Argentine professional footballer who played as a winger or forward.He is now assistant manager at Al-Gharafa SC.

Club career

Lanús
Born in Alejandro Korn, Leto began his career with Buenos Aires club Lanús, making his first team debut on 25 June 2005. He spent two seasons at the club, making 52 appearances and scoring 8 goals.

Liverpool
On 10 August 2007, Leto signed for Liverpool for £1,850,000 ($3.6million). His debut was against Toulouse, in a 4–0 victory for UEFA Champions League qualifying round fixture on 28 August 2007.

Following this he featured in another Champions League game and two Football League Cup matches. He never made his Premier League debut due to problems with his passport, forcing him to play in the Liverpool reserve team instead. Leto was granted an Italian passport in mid-2007 but this was later revoked, making the Argentine need to apply for a work permit; a request which was later refused. Liverpool manager Rafael Benítez criticised the decision given the player's track record in the Champions League and national selection for the Olympics.

Olympiacos
Leto joined the Greek team Olympiacos in June 2008 on a one-year loan deal.

On 16 September 2008, Leto scored the second goal in the 2–0 UEFA Cup first round, first leg victory away against FC Nordsjælland. He scored his first and only league goal in a 2–1 home win against Thrassyvoulos in December 2008.

Panathinaikos
On 23 June 2009, Liverpool accepted an offer from Panathinaikos believed to be in the region of £3,000,000. On 1 July 2009, the player signed a 5-year contract for about 1.2 million (with bonus fees).
On 28 July, Leto made his debut appearance for the greens on the away UEFA Champions League qualifying stages game against Sparta Prague, coming from the bench on the second half. On 8 August in Athens, Panathinaikos needed a two-goal margin victory and Leto was one of the starting eleven for the Greek side who dominated the game 3–0 and qualified to the next round.
On 19 August, Leto came from the bench to score in Panathinaikos 2–3 defeat to Atlético Madrid in the UEFA Champions League play-off first leg.
On 22 August Leto scored two goals against the Cretan side Ergotelis away in a 3–0 victory.
On 13 September, Leto scored the only goal against the Thracians Panthrakikos in an important 1–0 away victory.
On 24 April 2010 he scored the victorious goal of Panathinaikos at the Greek Cup final against Aris Thessaloniki. The previous week he also won the Greek championship, thus achieving the double (second consequent double of his career, after the first one with Olympiacos in 2009).
After the departure of captain Djibril Cissé and vice-captain Gilberto Silva he was chosen after two seasons serving the club to be the 3rd Captain.

Leto started the 2011–12 Superleague Greece in commanding form, netting a brace in a 3–2 victory over Xanthi on 16 October. He followed this up by notching another brace against Ergotelis on 22 October, in which Panathinaikos ran out 4–0 winners. Leto's good performances were enough for Serie B table-toppers Torino to report interest in the Argentine, as they look to regain status in the Italian top flight.

On 30 October, Panathinaikos faced PAOK, Leto grabbed a goal as his side won 3–1 and maintained their lead at the top of the Greek first division. In the following game against Ergotelis, Leto added two more goals as his side won 4–0. Leto's inspired start to the season resulted with ten goals and one assist from the first seven games. His performances were enough to guide Panathinaikos to the top of the table on 19 points, having played fewer games than most of their title challengers.
Leto continued in brilliant form scoring 15 goals in 13 matches as well as 5 assists, keeping Panathinaikos still in the fight for the title.

Through the first 17 league fixtures, Leto lead the goal-scorers chart with 15 league goals. On 25 January 2012, Leto suffered a knee injury and flew to Bologna to be checked by a specialist who said that he would be forced out at least until March.  It was revealed in March though that he would not be available until at least early April with continued knee problems. After a few days, it was revealed that Leto will not be available for the whole season. On 22 January 2013, Leto terminated his contract with Panathinaikos.

Catania
On 16 April 2013, Catania confirmed that they had signed the Argentine on a deal over a few seasons, the exact details of the length and payment were not released.
Sebastian Leto was brought in during the summer 2013, on a free transfer as a replacement for the departed Alejandro Gomez. The former Panathinaikos winger had a history of knee problems, which ultimately led to his release from the Greek club. Catania took a gamble, but he failed to live up to expectations. Leto suffered another knee injury and was being unfairly compared to Gomez, who was arguably the Rossazzuri's best player, but the Argentinean did not succeed in making an impact at the club, and in January 2015 signed a year-long loan with his former Argentinian club Lanús. On 11 February 2015, Leto was taken to hospital for emergency treatment after a barbell fell on his head during training. The then 28-year-old, who had been on loan at Argentinian club Lanus since 3 February for a loan fee of €500,000, was initially sent home by the medical staff with a deep wound in his head. But he later went to the hospital after suffering headaches and was placed in intensive care. Doctors feared Leto may have had internal hemorrhaging.

At the end of the loan, Cypriot club Anorthosis have made an offer for Sebastian Leto, but the Argentine left winger asked for a 48 hours deadline because he prefers to join Greek side Panathinaikos. The 29-year-old playerwas recently released by Lanús and wants to return to the Greens after three years, asking for a low-salary contract.

Second spell at Panathinaikos
In early February 2015, there were rumours of a return to Panathinaikos, after Leto was released from Catania.
The manager of Palermo, Guillermo Barros Schelotto spoke about his compatriot and former player at Lanús, Sebastian Leto, and his desire to return in Greece for Panathinaikos."Leto was enjoying being in an argentine club and having his family along, but he always wanted to return in Greece for Panathinaikos. He had a serious accident, but he is strong and despite not playing match in Lanus, in a good fitness condition. Sebastian is a talented and clever player, with quality and still a future ahead of him, he will help Panathinaikos very much and maybe the next season decrease the difference from champions Olympiakos", said the 43-year-old Argentine at SDNA''.

On 5 February 2016, Panathinaikos officially announced the signing of Sebastian Leto until the end of the following season and the Argentinian left winger returned to the club after three years. On 3 April 2016, he helped his club by scoring a brace to win a game against Veria for the Greek Super League. At the beginning of the 2016–17 Superleague Greece he eventually picked up his favorite number, no.11. On 11 September 2016, he scored his first goal for the 2016-17 season in a 3–0 away win against Levadiakos. On 24 May 2017, thanks to a spot kick by the experienced Argentine attacking midfielder, Panathinaikos won a crucial game rivals AEK Athens at Leoforos Stadium, for the 2016-17 Playoffs.

On 1 June 2017, Panathinaikos announced that the club will not renew Leto's contract, so their co-operation ended.

On 8 October 2017, Leto, (after Michael Essien, Rasmus Thelander, Jens Wemmer, Stathis Tavlaridis and Niklas Hult) became the latest player to file an appeal against Panathinaikos for late payment. The Argentinian claimed had not been paid his wages by the club since January 2017, estimated to amount to €181,315.

Emirates Club
On 20 August 2017, he signed a long season contract, with the possible extension for a year, with UAE Arabian Gulf League club Emirates Club. On 17 September in his debut with the club, he scored his first goal against Al Dhafra FC sealing a 3–3 home draw.

Career statistics

Honours
Olympiacos
Super League Greece: 2008–09
Greek Football Cup: 2008–09

Panathinaikos
Super League Greece: 2009–10
Greek Football Cup: 2009–10

References

External links

  
 Fan club 
 Best YouTube Tribute Video (for season 09-10)
 
 Sebastián Leto statistics at Fútbol XXI  
 Sebastián Leto player page on Lanús's official site 
 
 LFChistory.net player profile

Argentine footballers
Association football wingers
Association football forwards
Club Atlético Lanús footballers
Liverpool F.C. players
Panathinaikos F.C. players
Olympiacos F.C. players
Catania S.S.D. players
People from San Vicente Partido
Emirates Club players
1986 births
Living people
Argentine expatriate footballers
Expatriate footballers in England
Expatriate footballers in Greece
Expatriate footballers in Italy
Argentine Primera División players
Super League Greece players
Serie A players
Argentine people of Italian descent
Argentine expatriate sportspeople in Greece
Argentine expatriate sportspeople in England
Expatriate footballers in the United Arab Emirates
UAE Pro League players
Sportspeople from Buenos Aires Province